40 y 20 is a Mexican sitcom produced by Gustavo Loza for Televisa.

Series overview

Episodes

Season 1 (2016)

Season 2 (2016)

Season 3 (2017)

Season 4 (2018)

Season 5 (2020)

Season 6 (2021)

Season 7 (2021)

Season 8 (2022)

Season 9 (2022)

References 

40 y 20